Hawise of Normandy (died 21 February 1034) was Countess of Rennes, Duchess of Brittany and Regent to her son Alan III, Duke of Brittany from 1008 until 1026.

Life
Hawise was the daughter of Richard I of Normandy and Gunnor, and was sister of Richard II "the Good", Duke of Normandy as well as Robert, Archbishop of Rouen, Count of Evreux.

Duchess of Brittany
Hawise and her two sisters all formed important dynastic alliances. Emma of Normandy was twice Queen consort of England marrying firstly Æthelred the Unready and secondly Cnut the Great. Maud of Normandy married Odo II, Count of Blois. And Hawise was a part of an important dynastic double marriage for in 996, she married Geoffrey I, Duke of Brittany, while her brother Richard II, Duke of Normandy shortly afterwards married Geoffrey's sister Judith of Brittany. This double alliance between Normandy and Brittany, probably designed to safeguard both families, certainly functioned as such regarding Brittany.

Regency
In 1008 when Geoffrey died leaving two young sons, Alan III and Eudo, Richard stepped in to protect them and played a major role in governing Brittany during their minority.

Hawise acted as regent of Brittany during the minority of her son Alan III. In 1010 her regency and the reign of her young son Alan III was seriously challenged by the peasant revolts that had spread from Normandy into Brittany. Alan, encouraged by his mother, led the nobles to quash the rebellion. 

Hawise died on 21 February 1034.

Issue
She had four children:

 Alan III of Brittany (997-1040).
 Evenus (c. 998 - aft. 1037).
 Odo, Count of Penthièvre (d. 1079).
 Adela, Abbess of St. Georges.

Notes

References 

970s births
1034 deaths
House of Normandy
11th-century women rulers
Regents of Brittany
Duchesses of Brittany
10th-century Breton people
10th-century French women
11th-century Breton people
11th-century French women